Burn Country is a 2016 American crime film directed by Ian Olds and written by Ian Olds and Paul Felten. The film stars James Franco, Melissa Leo, Rachel Brosnahan, Dominic Rains, Tim Kniffin, Thomas Jay Ryan, and James Oliver Wheatley. The film was released on December 9, 2016, by Orion Pictures and Samuel Goldwyn Films.

Principal photography took place largely in Sonoma County, California. Much of the film was shot in Sebastopol, California, Santa Rosa, California, and Bodega Bay, California.

Cast
James Franco as Lindsay
Melissa Leo as Gloria
Rachel Brosnahan as Sandra
Dominic Rains as Osman
Thomas Jay Ryan as Dmitri Sokurov
James Oliver Wheatley as Gabe
Gail Gamble as Critic
Wendy Vanden Heuvel as Maddie
Ari Vozaitis as Pyro Kid
Tim Kniffin as Carl
Gabe Maxson as Marcus
Michelle Maxson as Karen

Release
The film premiered at the Tribeca Film Festival on April 16, 2016. The film was released on December 9, 2016, by Orion Pictures and Samuel Goldwyn Films.

References

External links
 
 

2016 films
2010s English-language films
2016 drama films
American drama films
2010s American films